Andrew Thomas McDonald, O.S.B., (12 February 1871 – 22 May 1950) was a Roman Catholic clergyman who served as the Archbishop of the Archdiocese of St. Andrews and Edinburgh, United Kingdom.

Born in Fort William on 12 February 1871, he was ordained a priest of Order of Saint Benedict on 9 August 1896. He was appointed the Archbishop of St. Andrews and Edinburgh on 19 July 1929 and consecrated to the Episcopate on 24 September 1929. The principal consecrator was Archbishop Donald Mackintosh, and the principal co-consecrators were Bishop James William McCarthy and Bishop John Toner.

David Ogilvy described McDonald as, "a very sweet old man, the nearest thing to an angel I've ever known".

He died in office on 22 May 1950, aged 79.

References

1871 births
1950 deaths
20th-century Roman Catholic archbishops in Scotland
Roman Catholic archbishops of St Andrews and Edinburgh
People from Fort William, Highland